Geneva Academy is a private classical Christian school located in Lincoln, Delaware.  The school was founded in 2007 by a group of homeschool parents, taking inspiration from Dorothy Sayers essay "The Lost Tools of Learning," as well as Douglas Wilson's books, Recovering the Lost Tools of Learning and The Case for Classical Christian Education. Geneva Academy follows a traditional education pattern called the Trivium.  This pattern consists of three successive stages: grammar, logic (dialectic),  and rhetoric.  Geneva Academy was a member of Association of Classical and Christian Schools but, as of September 2020, is no longer a member.

References

Christian schools in Delaware
Classical Christian schools
Private high schools in Delaware
Schools in Sussex County, Delaware
Private middle schools in Delaware
Private elementary schools in Delaware
Educational institutions established in 2007
2007 establishments in Delaware